Berge is a little village and municipality in Bajo Aragón, Teruel Province, Aragon, Spain. According to the 2010 census the municipality has a population of 274 inhabitants.

The town is located at the edge of the mountainous Maestrazgo comarca. The Guadalopillo River flows through Berge and the Sierra de los Caballos, part of the eastern Sistema Ibérico, rises south of the town.

See also
Bajo Aragón
Maestrazgo, Aragon
List of municipalities in Teruel

References 

Vicente Orta Calvet. Toponimos de Berge. El Boletín de Berge

External links 

CAI Aragon - Berge
CAI Aragon - La Posada de Berge

Municipalities in the Province of Teruel